Thallarcha sparsana, the fair footman, is a moth of the subfamily Arctiinae. The species was first described by Francis Walker in 1863. It is found in the Australian states of Victoria, New South Wales and Queensland.

References

Lithosiini
Moths described in 1863